Crutchfield is an unincorporated community along the Yadkin River in the Marsh Township of Surry County, North Carolina, United States .

Overview
The community, situated across the Yadkin River just north of Boonville,  was a stop on the former Southern Railway, now used by the Yadkin Valley Railroad.

The community is named for Charlie Crutchfield, a worker who died during the construction of a railroad trestle bridge in the area. Crutchfield, who had no relatives,  was buried on the Yadkin County side of the river.

References

Unincorporated communities in Surry County, North Carolina
Unincorporated communities in North Carolina